Homayoun Shahrokhi  (born 2 March 1946) is an Iranian football coach and former player.

He is known mostly for playing for PAS Tehran F.C., he was captain of the team winning the Takht Jamshid Cup twice (1976/77 ad 1977/78). Later on he managed PAS Tehran F.C. for several years. He was also head coach of Iran national football team for a short period, from February till September 2003. He was also technical manager of Iran national football team from 2004 until 2006.

References

Iranian footballers
Iranian football managers
Iranian expatriate football managers
Living people
Iran national football team managers
1945 births
Paykan F.C. managers
Pas players
Association football midfielders
Foolad F.C. managers
Al-Shaab CSC managers